Souxie, born Jumixu, was a Chanyu of the Xiongnu Empire. The brother and successor of Fuzhulei Ruoti, he reigned from 20 to 12 BC. Souxie died on his way to Chang'an in 12 BC and was succeeded by his brother Juya Chanyu.

Footnotes

References

Bichurin N.Ya., "Collection of information on peoples in Central Asia in ancient times", vol. 1, Sankt Petersburg, 1851, reprint Moscow-Leningrad, 1950

Taskin B.S., "Materials on Sünnu history", Science, Moscow, 1968, p. 31 (In Russian)

Chanyus
1st-century BC rulers in Asia
12 BC deaths